Grand Prix Cycliste La Marseillaise, formerly known as the Grand Prix d'Ouverture La Marseillaise, is a single-day road bicycle race held annually in February around the city of Marseille, France. Since 2005, the race is organized as a 1.1 event on the UCI Europe Tour. It is usually the first race of the European calendar, one day before the stage-race Étoile de Bessèges, which is held in the same region.

Winners

Winners by nationality

References

External links
 

 
UCI Europe Tour races
Recurring sporting events established in 1980
1980 establishments in France
Cycle races in France
Sport in Gard
Sport in Marseille
Sport in Bouches-du-Rhône